George Monckton-Arundell may refer to:

George Monckton-Arundell, 8th Viscount Galway (1882 – 1943), British politician
George Monckton-Arundell, 7th Viscount Galway (1844 – 1931), British Conservative politician and courtier
George Monckton-Arundell, 6th Viscount Galway (1805 – 1876), Anglo-Irish Conservative politician